The Disneyland Railroad (DRR), originally the Euro Disneyland Railroad (EDRR), is a 3-foot narrow gauge  heritage railroad in Disneyland Park in the Disneyland Paris Resort in Marne-la-Vallée, France, which was inaugurated on April 12, 1992, the park's opening day.

Experience
Main Street Station is seen upon entering Disneyland Park, in Main Street, U.S.A.. From there, guests can start their journey around the park, with a recorded narration speaking in both French and English about visited landscapes.

Trains first cross a diorama recreation of the Grand Canyon, complete with wild animals and storm effects, and also hides the show building for Phantom Manor. As they arrive in Frontierland, travelling behind the Rivers of the Far West, they first stop in Frontierland Depot.

Then trains travel through the Adventureland section, allowing guests to discover the Temple of Peril and witnessing the inside of the ride Pirates of the Caribbean, before arriving at Fantasyland Station.

Fantasyland Station was located in the British part of England in Fantasyland section (which also includes Peter Pan's Flight and Alice's Curious Labyrinth) where guests are given a whole view on the land, and then trains even venture through the facade of It's a Small World.

Finally, in the Discoveryland section, the train stops above the Star Tours - The Adventures Continue and Mickey's PhilharMagic attraction at Discoveryland Station. The journey comes to an end while returning to Main Street.

Rolling stock
The Disneyland Railroad operates four 4-4-0 steam locomotives. The first three were built by H.P. Phillips Company in 1992, while the fourth was made by Severn Lamb in 1993. These locomotives are all based on the No. 1 C.K. Holliday locomotive of the original Disneyland Railroad, and are built to essentially the same specifications, with only cosmetic differences. There are also twenty passenger cars, with five assigned to each locomotive.

Incidents

On January 2, 2013 at 8:40 pm, as the DRR's No. 1 locomotive approached the Frontierland station with its train, the front car was uncoupled from the other four cars. When the locomotive stopped at Frontierland station, the three rear cars struck the front car. Forty-three guests and four employees were on the train at this time of the incident. Thirty-nine guests were immediately taken care of by park agents to exit the train safely, while the other four guests were taken to the hospital and later discharged, even with minor injuries.

See also

Rail transport in Walt Disney Parks and Resorts

References

Bibliography

Further reading

External links

1992 establishments in France
Amusement rides introduced in 1992
Disneyland Park (Paris)
Heritage railways in France
Main Street, U.S.A.
Rail transport in Walt Disney Parks and Resorts
Railway lines opened in 1992
Railways of amusement parks in France
Walt Disney Parks and Resorts attractions